The 2012–13 Oral Roberts Golden Eagles men's basketball team represented Oral Roberts University during the 2012–13 NCAA Division I men's basketball season. The Golden Eagles, led by 14th year head coach Scott Sutton, played their home games at the Mabee Center and were first year members of the Southland Conference. They finished the season 20–15, 13–5 in Southland play to finish in third place. They lost in the quarterfinals of the Southland tournament to Sam Houston State. They were invited to the 2013 CIT where they defeated Texas–Arlington and UC Irvine to advance to the quarterfinals where they lost to Weber State.

Roster

Schedule

|-
!colspan=9| Exhibition

|-
!colspan=9| Regular season

|-
!colspan=9| 2013 Southland Conference men's basketball tournament

|-
!colspan=9| 2013 CIT

References

Oral Roberts Golden Eagles men's basketball seasons
Oral Roberts
Oral Roberts
Oral Roberts Golden Eagles men's basketball
Oral Roberts Golden Eagles men's basketball